Tropical Storm Cristobal was a strong tropical storm that paralleled the East Coast of the United States, traveling from Florida to Nova Scotia. The third named storm of the 2008 Atlantic hurricane season, Cristobal formed on July 19 from a trough of low pressure off the Southeast U.S. Coast. In a marginally favorable environment, it attained minimal tropical storm status later that day. The storm remained offshore, and peaked as a strong tropical storm on July 21 while it passed east of Cape Hatteras. It accelerated northeast parallel to the East Coast and became extratropical on July 23 near Nova Scotia. Because it was a weak storm and never made landfall, Cristobal's effects were mostly limited to moderate rainfall. The storm dropped 3.43 in (87 mm) of rain in Wilmington, North Carolina, where minor flooding was reported. Additionally, the extratropical remnants contributed to rainfall on Nova Scotia which caused some street and basement flooding.

Meteorological history

On July 14, 2008 a weakening surface trough extended across northern Florida, producing thunderstorms across the state. A weak low pressure area developed on July 15 near Tallahassee, which moved southeastward into the Gulf of Mexico. Late on July 16 it crossed onshore near Tampa, and development was not anticipated due to land interaction. Late on July 17, however, convection increased in association with the low, and the system quickly became better organized. Late on July 18, the National Hurricane Center (NHC) remarked that a tropical depression was developing, with its convection becoming more concentrated around a circulation; at 11 p.m. EST on July 18 (0300 UTC July 19), it was classified as Tropical Depression Three, about 65 miles (105 km) southeast of Charleston, South Carolina.

Located between a ridge to its southeast and northwest, the depression moved slowly northeastward, and with a marginally favorable upper-level environment, it attained minimal tropical storm status during the early afternoon of July 19. Initially fairly disorganized with little deep convection, dry air in the mid- to-upper-levels of the atmosphere prevented immediate intensification. However, late on July 20 thunderstorm activity increased. Cristobal remained a fairly weak tropical storm as it tracked adjacent to the Carolina coast, and the storm never made landfall. It reached peak intensity as a strong tropical storm on July 21 while it passed east of Cape Hatteras, and remained such over the warm Gulf Stream waters as convection became strong over the southern portion of the circulation. Beginning to enter cooler waters, the cyclone accelerated east-northeastward on July 21 and July 22. On the afternoon of July 22, Cristobal began to weaken south of Nova Scotia. In the evening hours, satellite imagery indicated that the mid-level center became separated from the low-level center. The storm's cloud pattern became disorganized, and by July 23 it had completed an extratropical transition. The National Hurricane Center issued its last advisory on the system at 5:00 am EDT (0900 UTC) on July 23.

Preparations

In anticipation of Tropical Storm Cristobal, a tropical storm warning was issued for coastal areas from the South Santee River in South Carolina to the North Carolina–Virginia Border. The advisory was discontinued on July 20 as Cristobal pulled away from land. Flood advisories were declared for parts of North Carolina. National Weather Service forecasters advised against swimming due to high seas and potential rip currents. Environment Canada issued rain warnings throughout portions of Nova Scotia.

Impact
Prior to forming, the precursor low dropped light to moderate rainfall across the state of Florida. In Lake Wales, 6 inches (150 mm) of precipitation was reported, most of which fell within the period of two hours. The sudden, heavy rainfall clogged storm drains, causing some street flooding. Up to 40 cars were pulled from flooded streets, some being submerged with 2 ft (0.6 m) of water. Damages from the flooding was estimated at $10,000. In Georgia, the storm produced  of rain, while in South Carolina,  was recorded.

On July 20, Cristobal skirted eastern North Carolina, resulting in minimal damage. Rainfall averaged , though the NEXRAD weather radar estimates indicated that isolated amounts exceeded . The storm dropped  in Wilmington, North Carolina, where minor flooding occurred.

While the center of Cristobal was more than a day away from the Canadian Maritimes, moisture extended ahead of the cyclone and became enhanced by a stalled frontal system. As a result, heavy rainfall fell along the Atlantic coast of Nova Scotia. At Baccaro Point, 224 mm (8.8 in) of rain was reported, while 145 mm (5.8 in) fell at Sambro, near Halifax. The rain flooded basements and streets in the Cape Sable area. A sailor from Connecticut was rescued  to the southeast of Halifax when his ship capsized in stormy seas.

See also

2008 Atlantic hurricane season
Timeline of the 2008 Atlantic hurricane season
List of Florida hurricanes (2000–present)
List of North Carolina hurricanes (2000–present)
Other storms of the same name

References

External links

Tropical Storm Cristobal (2008) HPC rainfall page.

2008 Atlantic hurricane season
Atlantic tropical storms
Tropical Storm Cristobal
Hurricanes in North Carolina
Hurricanes in Canada
2008 disasters in Canada
Cristobal